4th BSFC Awards
January 29, 1984

Best Film: 
 The Night ofthe Shooting Stars 
The 4th Boston Society of Film Critics Awards honored the best filmmaking of 1983. The awards were given on 29 January 1984.

Winners
Best Film:
The Night of the Shooting Stars (La notte di San Lorenzo)
Best Actor:
 Eric Roberts – Star 80
Best Actress: 
 Rosanna Arquette – Baby It's You
Best Supporting Actor:
 Jack Nicholson – Terms of Endearment
Best Supporting Actress:
 Linda Hunt – The Year of Living Dangerously
Best Director:
Paolo and Vittorio Taviani – The Night of the Shooting Stars (La notte di San Lorenzo)
Best Screenplay:
Éric Rohmer – Pauline at the Beach (Pauline à la plage)
Best Cinematography:
Hiro Narita – Never Cry Wolf
Best Documentary:
Say Amen, Somebody 
Best American Film:
Terms of Endearment

External links
Past Winners

References 
1983 Boston Society of Film Critics Awards Internet Movie Database

1983
1983 film awards
1983 awards in the United States
1983 in Boston
January 1984 events in the United States